This is a list of the Government Juntas that have ruled Chile as an executive government, since its independence:

Government Junta of the Kingdom of Chile (1810), also known as the First Junta
Government Junta of Chile (August, 1811), also known as the Executive Junta or Second Junta
Government Junta of Chile (September, 1811), also known as the Superior Junta or Third Junta
Government Junta of Chile (November, 1811), also known as the Provisional Junta or Fourth Junta
Government Junta of Chile (December, 1811), also known as the December Junta or Fifth Junta
Government Junta of Chile (April, 1812), also known as the Superior Governmental Junta or Sixth Junta
Government Junta of Chile (October 2, 1812), also known as the Government Junta or Seventh Junta
Government Junta of Chile (October 27, 1812), also known as the Government Junta or Eighth Junta
Government Junta of Chile (1813), also known as the Superior Governmental Junta or Ninth Junta
Government Junta of Chile (1814), also known as the Superior Governmental Junta or Tenth Junta
Government Junta of Chile (1823), also known as the Governmental Junta
Government Junta of Chile (1829)
Government Junta of Chile (1891), also known as the Revolutionary Junta of Iquique or Iquique Junta 
Government Junta of Chile (1924), also known as the September Junta or Military Junta
Government Junta of Chile (1925), also known as the January Junta
Government Junta of Chile (1932), also known as the Government Junta of Socialist Republic or Socialist Junta
Government Junta of Chile (1973), also known as the Military Junta

See also
 History of Chile

Modern history of Chile
Government of Chile
Politics of Chile